Adam Saliba (born 14 July 1972) is a former Australian rules footballer who played with Adelaide in the Australian Football League (AFL).

Saliba, a player sporting a Mullet hairstyle, from North Adelaide, was one of the 52 players on Adelaide's list for their inaugural season in 1991. He didn't play an AFL game that year and had to wait until late in the 1992 season for a call up. On debut, in a win over the Sydney Swans at Football Park, Saliba had 26 disposals. He played in the next 2 games for Adelaide and at the end of the season he quit from playing in the AFL.

References

External links
 
 

1972 births
Australian rules footballers from South Australia
Adelaide Football Club players
North Adelaide Football Club players
South Australian State of Origin players
Living people